Philip Yorke, 3rd Earl of Hardwicke, KG, PC, FRS (31 May 1757 – 18 November 1834), known as Philip Yorke until 1790, was a British politician.

Background and education

Born in Cambridge, England, he was the eldest son of Charles Yorke, Lord Chancellor, by his first wife, Catherine Freman. He was educated at Harrow and Queens' College, Cambridge.

In 1790 he succeeded his uncle Philip Yorke, 2nd Earl of Hardwicke to his earldom and estates, including Wimpole Hall.

Political career
Hardwicke was Member of Parliament for Cambridgeshire from 1780 to 1790, following the Whig traditions of his family, but after his succession to the earldom in 1790 he supported William Pitt The Younger, and took office in 1801 as Lord Lieutenant of Ireland (1801–1806), where he supported Catholic emancipation. He was sworn of the Privy Council in 1801, created a Knight of the Garter in 1803, and was a fellow of the Royal Society.

Family
Lord Hardwicke married Lady Elizabeth, daughter of James Lindsay, 5th Earl of Balcarres, in 1782. They had four sons and four daughters.
 Philip Yorke, Viscount Royston (7 May 1784-04 Apr 1808), was Member of Parliament for Reigate but was lost at sea off Lübeck (having died without issue);
 Lady Anne Yorke (1783 – 17 July 1870); married John Savile, 3rd Earl of Mexborough, and had issue.
 Lady Catherine Freeman Yorke (14 April 1786 – 8 July 1863); married Du Pre Alexander, 2nd Earl of Caledon, and had issue.
 Charles Yorke (23 August 1787 – 28 December 1791)
 Lady Elizabeth Margaret Yorke (1789 – 23 June 1867); married Charles Stuart, 1st Baron Stuart de Rothesay and had issue.
 Lady Caroline Harriet Yorke (15 October 1794 – 27 May 1873); married John Somers-Cocks, 2nd Earl Somers, and had issue.
 Charles James Yorke, Viscount Royston (14 July 1797 – 30 April 1810); died at Wimpole of scarlet fever.
 Joseph John Yorke (12 August 1800 – March 1801)

Lord Hardwicke died on 18 Nov 1834, aged 77, and was buried St Andrew's Church in Wimpole, Cambridgeshire, in a tomb by Richard Westmacott the Younger. As he had no surviving male issue, he was succeeded in the earldom by his nephew Charles. Lady Hardwicke died on 26 May 1858, aged 94.

References

Duke of Buckingham: Memoirs of the Court and Cabinets of George III. 4 vols. London, 1853–1855

External links

1757 births
1834 deaths
3
Fellows of the Royal Society
Knights of the Garter
Lord-Lieutenants of Cambridgeshire
Lords Lieutenant of Ireland
Yorke, Philip
People educated at Harrow School
Alumni of Queens' College, Cambridge
Philip
People from Wimpole